The year 1937 was marked, in science fiction, by the following events.

Births and deaths

Births 
 February 19 : Terry Carr, American writer and editor (died 1987)
 February 22 : Joanna Russ, American writer (died 2011)
 April 9 : Barrington J. Bayley, British writer (died 2008)
 May 13 : Roger Zelazny,  American writer (died 1995)
 May 27 : Gérard Klein, French writer and editor
 September 19 : Jean-Pierre Andrevon, French writer

Deaths

Events

Literary releases

Novels 
  La Cité des asphyxiés, by Régis Messac.
 Star Maker, by Olaf Stapledon.
 Galactic Patrol, by Edward Elmer Smith.
 Swastika Night by Katharine Burdekin.

Stories collections

Short stories 
 Travel by Wire!, Arthur C. Clarke's first published story

Comics 
  Futuropolis, by René Pellos.

Movies 
 Night Key, by Lloyd Corrigan.

Awards 
The main science-fiction Awards known at the present time did not exist at this time.

See also 
 1937 in science
 1936 in science fiction

References

Science fiction by year

science-fiction